Rodrigo González (born 14 December 1989) is a Mexican triathlete. He competed in the men's event at the 2016 Summer Olympics.

References

External links
 

1989 births
Living people
Mexican male triathletes
Olympic triathletes of Mexico
Triathletes at the 2016 Summer Olympics
Place of birth missing (living people)
Triathletes at the 2015 Pan American Games
Pan American Games competitors for Mexico
Sportspeople from Mexico City